Chlorociboria albohymenia is a species of fungus in the family Chlorociboriaceae. It is found in New Zealand.

References

External links

Helotiaceae
Fungi described in 2005
Fungi of New Zealand